The Crime at Blossoms is a 1933 British crime film directed by Maclean Rogers and starring Hugh Wakefield and Joyce Bland. It was remade by Rogers in 1949 as Dark Secret.

After moving into a picturesque country cottage, a woman becomes increasingly concerned about the fate of the previous owner who she believes was murdered. The film is based on a play by Mordaunt Shairp.

Cast
 Hugh Wakefield as Chris Merryman
 Joyce Bland as  Valerie Merryman
 Eileen Munro as  Mrs. Woodman
 Ivor Barnard as A late visitor
 Frederick Lloyd as  George Merryman
 Iris Baker as  Lena Denny
 Arthur Stratton as  Mr. Woodman
 Maud Gill as  Mrs. Merryman
 Wally Patch as Palmer
 Barbara Gott as  Fat Lady
 Moore Marriott as  Driver
 George Ridgwell as Process-Server

Critical reception
TV Guide called it an "Okay crime melodrama."

References

External links

1933 films
1933 crime drama films
Films directed by Maclean Rogers
British black-and-white films
British and Dominions Studios films
Films shot at Imperial Studios, Elstree
British crime drama films
Melodrama films
1930s English-language films
1930s British films